Mohammadabad (also Romanized as Moḩammadābād; also known as Kalāteh-ye Kadkhodā) is a village in Arabkhaneh Rural District, Shusef District, Nehbandan County, South Khorasan Province, Iran. In 2006, its population was 21, in six families.

References 

Populated places in Nehbandan County